is a Japanese professional footballer who plays as a left back for J.League club Júbilo Iwata.

Career
Ryo Takano joined J1 League club; Shonan Bellmare in 2015. May 20, he debuted in J.League Cup (v Matsumoto Yamaga FC). In 2016, he moved to Yokohama F. Marinos.

Club statistics
Updated to 19 December 2020.

Honours

Club
Yokohama F. Marinos
J1 League (1): 2019

References

External links
Profile at Ventforet Kofu
Profile at Yokohama F. Marinos 

1994 births
Living people
Nippon Sport Science University alumni
People from Yamato, Kanagawa
Association football people from Kanagawa Prefecture
Japanese footballers
J1 League players
J2 League players
Shonan Bellmare players
Yokohama F. Marinos players
Ventforet Kofu players
Júbilo Iwata players
Association football defenders